Captain California is the tenth studio album by American rapper Murs. The album was released on March 10, 2017 by Strange Music.

Track listing

Charts

References

2017 albums
Murs (rapper) albums
Strange Music albums
Albums produced by Seven (record producer)